The following is an overview of the television ratings for the National Hockey League (NHL)'s Stanley Cup Finals in both the United States and Canada.

American television

ABC/TNT's coverage (2022–)

The following table shows the ratings for each game of the Stanley Cup finals aired on ABC in even numbered years and on TNT in odd numbered years. The numbers in parentheses represent number of viewers (measured in millions).

NBC's coverage (2006–2021)

The following table shows the ratings for each game of the Stanley Cup finals. The numbers in parentheses represent number of viewers (measured in millions).

ABC's coverage (2000–2004)

Fox's coverage (1995–1999)

Most watched games in the U.S.

Most watched Stanley Cup finals games (1966–present)
Source: 

  May 18, 1971, Montreal-Chicago – game seven, 12.41 million, 20.6 rating CBS 
  May 11, 1972, Boston-NY Rangers – game six, 10.93 million, 17.6 rating CBS
  May 10, 1973, Montreal-Chicago – game six, 9.41 million, 15.2 rating NBC
  June 12, 2019, St. Louis-Boston - game seven, 8.72 million, 4.9 rating NBC
  June 15, 2011, Boston-Vancouver – game seven, 8.54 million, 4.8 rating, 8 share NBC
  April 30, 1972, NY Rangers-Boston – game one, 8.51 million, 13.7 rating CBS
  May 12, 1974, Boston-Philadelphia – game three, 8.30 million, 12.5 rating NBC
  June 9, 2010, Chicago-Philadelphia – game six, 8.28 million, 4.7 rating, 6 share, NBC
  May 7, 1972, Boston-NY Rangers – game four, 8.26 million, 13.3 rating CBS
  June 24, 2013, Chicago-Boston — game six, 8.16 million, 4.7 rating, NBC
  June 15, 2015, Chicago-Tampa Bay – game six, 8 million, 4.4 rating, 8 share, NBC

Stanley Cup game seven viewership history (1966–present)
As per Fang's Bites.
 May 18, 1971, Montreal-Chicago, 12.41 million, 20.6 rating CBS
 June 12, 2019, St. Louis-Boston, 8.72 million, 4.9 rating, NBC
 June 15, 2011, Boston-Vancouver, 8.54 million, 4.8 rating, NBC
 June 12, 2009, Pittsburgh-Detroit, 7.99 million, 4.3 rating, NBC
 June 9, 2003, Anaheim-New Jersey, 7.17 million, 4.9 million households, 4.6 rating, ABC
 June 9, 2001, New Jersey-Colorado, 6.95 million, 4.268 million households, 4.2 rating, ABC
 June 7, 2004, Calgary-Tampa Bay, 6.29 million, 4.5 million households, 4.2 rating, ABC
 June 14, 1994, NY Rangers-Vancouver, 5.44 million, 3.28 million households, 5.2 rating (6.9 rating when including MSG network), ESPN
 June 19, 2006, Edmonton-Carolina, 5.29 million, 3.3 rating, NBC
 May 31, 1987, Edmonton-Philadelphia, 2.14 million households, ESPN

Canadian television

 – The series averaged 3.6 million viewers on CBC and Sportsnet, making it the most watched Finals in Canada since 2011.
 – Game seven was second most-watched CBC Sports program, drawing an average of 8.76 million viewers and trailing only the men's gold medal game at the 2002 Winter Olympics.
 – Game one was viewed by  people on CBC. Game six was the most-watched All-American Stanley Cup Final game, with 4.077 million viewers. The Final averaged 3.107 million viewers, up 44 percent from 2009.
 – Game seven drew an average of 3.529 million viewers to the CBC. However, it averaged 2.154 million viewers for the seven-game rematch, down 7% from the 2008 final.
 – With an average Canadian audience of 4.957 million viewers, game seven was the most watched CBC Sports program until the 10.6 million viewers for the men's ice hockey gold medal game between Canada and the United States at the 2002 Winter Olympics, when Canada won its first Olympic ice hockey gold medal since the 1952 Winter Olympics. Bob Cole said that Game 7 was one of his most memorable TV games.

See also
 Super Bowl television ratings
 World Series television ratings
 NBA Finals television ratings
 MLS Cup television ratings

References

External links
NHL Stanley Cup Finals TV Ratings, 1995-2008 
Sports Media Watch: Ratings
Stanley Cup Final Numbers Game

Stanley Cup Final Game 7 Becomes The Most Watched NHL Game In 38 Years

television ratings
National Hockey League television ratings
NHL on NBC
NBCSN
ABC Sports
CBS Sports
Fox Sports original programming
CBC Sports
SportsChannel
ESPN
USA Network Sports
Hughes Television Network
Turner Sports